Stichianthus is a monotypic genus of flowering plants belonging to the family Rubiaceae. The only species is Stichianthus minutiflorus.

Its native range is Borneo.

References

Rubiaceae
Monotypic Rubiaceae genera